Dacrydium elatum is a species of conifer in the family Podocarpaceae. It is found in Cambodia, Indonesia, Laos, Malaysia, Thailand, and Vietnam.

References

elatum
Trees of Indo-China
Trees of Malesia
Least concern plants
Taxonomy articles created by Polbot